Club Deportivo Domingo Savio  is a Dominican soccer team based in La Vega, Dominican Republic. Actually plays in the First Division Of The Dominican republic.

Football clubs in the Dominican Republic